Chester Joseph "Chet" Gay (January 8, 1900 – March 11, 1978) was an American football player in the National Football League. He first played with the Buffalo Bisons during the 1925 NFL season before playing the following season with the Milwaukee Badgers.

References

External links

1900 births
1978 deaths
People from Moose Lake, Minnesota
Buffalo Bisons (NFL) players
Milwaukee Badgers players
Minnesota Golden Gophers football players